The cysteinyl leukotriene receptors (CysLTRs) include the following two receptors:

 Cysteinyl leukotriene receptor 1 (CysLTR1)
 Cysteinyl leukotriene receptor 2 (CysLTR2)

The recently elucidated CysLTE, represented by GPR99/OXGR1, may constitute a third CysLTR.

See also
 Leukotriene receptor
 Eicosanoid receptor

References

G protein-coupled receptors